The Tour of Flanders, formerly the Tour of Flanders for Women, is an annual road bicycle racing event in Flanders, Belgium, held in early April. It is held on the same day as the men's race, on much of the same roads but at a shorter distance. Dutch riders Mirjam Melchers, Annemiek van Vleuten and German Judith Arndt hold the record with two wins each. Lotte Kopecky won the most recent edition in 2022.

The event has been held annually since 2004 on the same day as the men's race. From 2004 to 2015 it was part of the UCI Women's Road World Cup. Since 2016, the race is included in the UCI Women's World Tour, cycling's top-tier female elite competition. Since the first edition, organisers have included more climbs and extended the race gradually from 94 km in the first edition to 157 km in 2019.

From 2021, race organisers Flanders Classics have dropped the 'for Women' part of the name on their website, with the women's race now sharing the Tour of Flanders name with the men's race. To distinguish between the two races, they are now categorised as the 'Elite Men' and 'Elite Women' editions.

History

The first race
The first running of the Tour of Flanders for Women was held on 4 April 2004. The race was 94 km long, making it the shortest in history, and featured nine categorized climbs, including the Muur van Geraardsbergen and Bosberg as the last two climbs. The race started in Oudenaarde and finished in Ninove, with the last 55 km identical to the men's race. Russia's Zoulfia Zabirova won the inaugural event after she broke clear on the Muur and crossed the finish solo. Trixi Worrack beat Leontien van Moorsel in a sprint for second place.

Farce in 2005
The second Tour of Flanders in 2005 was extended to 112 km, featuring 12 climbs. Dutch rider Mirjam Melchers-van Poppel won the race, after distancing her teammate and breakaway companion Susanne Ljungskog in the final kilometer. The race for third place ended in farcical circumstances. A group of 20 riders was sent the wrong way in the final two kilometres and crossed the finish line in the opposite direction. All riders in the group, including World Cup leader Oenone Wood, were disqualified from the race. Melchers repeated her win in 2006, becoming the first to win the race twice.

By 2009, the race ran over 131 km and contained three long flat cobbled sectors in addition to the climbs. German sprinter Ina-Yoko Teutenberg won the event in a sprint of a 15-strong group ahead of Kirsten Wild and Emma Johansson. The first and only Belgian rider to win the Tour of Flanders was Grace Verbeke in 2010 after she narrowly stayed ahead of the chasing group.

Move to Oudenaarde

In 2012 the finish of both the men's and women's events moved to Oudenaarde, making Oudenaarde both the start and finish location of the women's race. The Oude Kwaremont and Paterberg replaced the Muur van Geraardsbergen and Bosberg as the final two climbs of the race. German Judith Arndt became the second woman to win the Tour of Flanders on two separate occasions. As she did in her first win in 2008, Arndt beat American Kristin Armstrong in a two-up sprint.

Cycling greatness Marianne Vos won the 2013 event, following three previous podium places, in a four-woman sprint ahead of Ellen van Dijk and Emma Johansson, after the quartet had gotten away on Oude Kwaremont. Van Dijk soloed to victory in 2014 with a move on the Hotond climb, at 26 km from the finish, and held a winning margin of more than one minute over Lizzie Armitstead and Emma Johansson. Elisa Longo Borghini was the first Italian winner in 2015 with an attack at 30 km from the finish. Jolien D'Hoore won the sprint for second before Anna van der Breggen.

World Tour Race

In 2016 the Tour of Flanders was included in the inaugural UCI Women's World Tour. Britain's Lizzie Armitstead won the race in a two-up sprint with Emma Johansson after the duo had broken clear on Oude Kwaremont. Sweden's Emma Johansson holds four podium finishes, but failed to claim a Tour of Flanders victory.

The 2017 event was the first run under the new UCI regulations, which allowed for longer women's races. The route was extended to 153.2 km, featuring 12 climbs and five flat sectors of cobbles. After a six-year hiatus, organisers brought back the Muur van Geraardsbergen, as they had done for the men. Coryn Rivera became the first American winner in an 18-strong sprint before Gracie Elvin and Chantal Blaak.

In 2018 the Tour of Flanders was the first women's event to be broadcast in full live on television. Olympic road race champion Anna van der Breggen won the race after a 28 km solo attack on the Kruisberg. She increased her lead over the Oude Kwaremont and Paterberg and maintained her effort to the finish. Amy Pieters was second at more than a minute from van der Breggen, the largest winning margin in the women's Tour of Flanders history.

Route

Present course

The race starts and finishes in Oudenaarde, 30 km south of Ghent in East Flanders. It is 157.4 km and has a similar finale as the men's Tour of Flanders, with many of the same hills, except for the Koppenberg. The first 90 km wind through the hills of the Zwalm region, before addressing the climbs in the Flemish Ardennes between Geraardsbergen and Oudenaarde in the last 60 km. The final 60 km contain the most iconic climbs, notably the Muur van Geraardsbergen, Oude Kwaremont and Paterberg. The course runs almost entirely in the province of East Flanders. Since 2017, eight kilometres of the trajectory between Geraardsbergen and Ronse run over roads in the Walloon province of Hainaut.

Climbs and cobbled roads
The short, sharp hills in the Flemish Ardennes are a defining feature of the Tour of Flanders and the locations where spectators gather in large numbers. Each climb has its own characteristics with varying gradients and surface, presenting different challenges to the riders. The Kwaremont is 2.2 km long with an uneven cobbled surface, but is relatively shallow in gradient. The Paterberg is short and, at 20 percent, the steepest climb of the women's race.

In 2017 and 2018, the race featured 12 climbs, compared to 18 in the men's event, and five long flat cobbled sectors. The final 31 km, including Kruisberg, Oude Kwaremont and Paterberg, are identical to the men's finale. In addition to the climbs, there are five flat sectors of cobbles in the first half of the race, i.e. Langemunte, Lippenhovestraat, Paddestraat, Holleweg and Haaghoek, comprising 7.8 km of cobbles.

Winners

Multiple winners

Wins per country

Statistics

 Shortest Tour of Flanders: 94 km (2004)
 Longest Tour of Flanders: 157.4 km (2019)
 Most wins: Mirjam Melchers, Annemiek van Vleuten and Judith Arndt (2)
 Most podium finishes: Annemiek van Vleuten (5)
 Most second places: Kristin Armstrong (2)
 Most country wins: The Netherlands (8)
 Youngest winner: Elisa Longo Borghini in 2015 (23 years and 116 days)
 Oldest winner: Annemiek van Vleuten in 2021 (38 years and 178 days)
 Largest margin between the winner and runner-up: 1 minute and 8 seconds (Anna van der Breggen in 2018)

Notes

External links

References

 
Tour of Flanders
UCI Women's Road World Cup
Recurring sporting events established in 2004
2004 establishments in Belgium
Cycle races in Belgium
UCI Women's World Tour races